Magnus Miller Murray (February 22, 1787 – March 4, 1838), served as the Mayor of Pittsburgh, Pennsylvania from 1828 to 1830 and again from 1831 to 1832.  Mayor Murray now rests in Section 19, Lot 29 of Allegheny Cemetery.

Early life
Murray was born in Philadelphia, to Commodore Alexander Murray and Mary Miller Murray. He was named after his maternal grandfather, Magnus Miller, a local merchant. He attended Pennsylvania University, earning both bachelor's and master's degrees in an era when many statesmen had only a grade school education. On January 6, 1806 he was admitted to the Philadelphia Bar. He married Mary Wilkens, daughter of John Wilkins, Jr. and Catherine Reagan Murray, on February 23, 1810.

Pittsburgh politics

Murray began politics as an understudy to his uncle, area judge and political insider William Wilkins.

Under Murray's mayoral administration, the Western Terminus of the Pennsylvania Canal was completed along the Grant Street corridor of the city. Murray was the first of a handful of Pittsburgh mayors to serve two non-consecutive terms in office, having to cede control of the mayor's office to Matthew B. Lowrie from 1830 to 1831, before regaining his mayoral powers.

Honors
Mayor Magnus Murray's son, James Butler Murray, President of the First Exchange Bank of Pittsburgh is remembered in the naming of Murray Avenue in Pittsburgh's Squirrel Hill neighborhood.

Membership
Member of The Society of the Cincinnati as the oldest male heir of Commodore Alexander Murray.

Other
His daughter, Julia N. Murray, married politician John V. Le Moyne. Murray is an ancestor of actress Julie Bowen.

References

Killikelly, S. (1906). The History of Pittsburgh: Its Rise and Progress. Pittsburgh: B.C. & Gordon Montgomery Co.
Martin, J. (1883). Martin's Bench and Bar of Philadelphia, Philadelphia: R. Welsh & co., (1883)

1787 births
1838 deaths
Mayors of Pittsburgh
Politicians from Philadelphia
University of Pennsylvania alumni
Burials at Allegheny Cemetery
19th-century American politicians